Royal Air Force Davidstow or more commonly RAF Davidstow Moor is a former Royal Air Force station located  north east of Camelford, Cornwall and  west of Launceston, Cornwall, England.

It was used from late 1942 until 1945 and despite a few periods of intense activity it was one of Coastal Command's lesser used airfields.

History

The land was acquired in 1941 and a three-runway airfield with extensive dispersal areas was constructed in the first half of 1942.  Despite the moorland conditions, construction was reasonably straightforward, although it did involve the removal of various field boundaries, the closure of minor roads and some drainage work.

RAF Davidstow Moor closed in December 1945 at the end of World War II and many of the buildings including the hangars were soon removed.  It became a motor racing circuit, known as Davidstow Circuit and in the early 1950s three Formula One races were held there (the Cornwall MRC Formula 1 Races) including the first success for the Lotus marque.

Posted units

A number of RAF Regiment units were also posted here at some point:

Wings;
 1329, 1330 & 1331
Squadrons;
 2708, 2731, 2738, 2743, 2748, 2776, 2778, 2786, 2792, 2793, 2796, 2802, 2810, 2886, 2889, 2954 & 2955

Current use
The disused former watch office/air traffic control tower is clearly visible on the airfield.

The airfield is still partly used by microlights and motor gliders with three runways in use.  The runway lengths and directions are: 02–20, 395m, 06–24, 489m, 12–30, 1,450m. PPR (prior permission required) is essential for this site. It is currently run by Davidstow Flying Club.

Davidstow Airfield and Cornwall at War Museum
The Davidstow Airfield and Cornwall at War Museum  has been set up to commemorate the work and people of RAF Davidstow Moor.  

It is located next to a creamery where Davidstow and Cathedral City cheeses are produced.  Many exhibits cover life in World War II in Cornwall, including other airfields along the North Cornwall coast, the Royal Navy, Army and civilian services, and life on the home front. Other exhibits include artifacts from the Royal Observer Corps and the Light Infantry, vehicles and weapons. A new hangar was completed in 2016 and now houses a growing collection of larger exhibits including a Fairey Gannet and Hawker Hunter F.6 aircraft, the cockpit section of a DH Vampire T.11 as well as a number of rare airfield and military vehicles.

Davidstow Moor RAF Memorial Museum
The adjacent yet separate Davidstow Moor RAF Memorial Museum is located in the former sergeants' shower block and focuses on the airfield's history during World War II using archive photographs and memorabilia.

Unauthorised festival
An unauthorised open-air music and dance event was held on the site in June 2022.

References

Citations

Bibliography
 Ordnance Survey: Landranger map sheet 200 Newquay & Bodmin 
 Delve, Ken The Military Airfields of Britain, South-Western England: Channel Islands, Cornwall, Devon, Dorset, Gloucestershire, Somerset, Wiltshire. 
A Guide to Airfields of South Western England. Baron Jay Publishers
 Keast, David C. Memories and Records of RAF Davidstow Moor, Cornwall [Camelford: the Author?]
 Knight, Rod & Anne (2016, 2nd edition) RAF Davidstow Moor 1942 to 1945. A Wartime History [CAWM Publishing, Cornwall at War Museum, Davidstow]

External links 

www.rafdavidstowmoor.com RAF Davidstow Moor
Cached Version of the above websites homepage
Davistow Airfield and Cornwall at War Museum
Davidstow Moor RAF Memorial Museum
www.controltowers.co.uk RAF Davidstow Moor
www.wartimememories.co.uk RAF Davidstow Moor
Peter Ascott's recollections of the aerodrome

Royal Air Force stations in Cornwall
Military history of Cornwall
Museums in Cornwall
Military and war museums in England
World War II museums in the United Kingdom